Herbert Lang (1879–1957) was a German zoologist.

Herbert Lang may also refer to:

 Herbert H. Lang (1921–2006), historian of the American West
 Herbert "Flight Time" Lang (born 1976), former basketball player for the Harlem Globetrotters
 Herbert Lang, artist (born 1976), is an Austrian visual artist and photographer

See also
Herbert Lange,  (1909–1945), German Nazi commander